

The Smith and the Devil is an Indo-European fairy tale. The story is of a smith who makes a pact with a malevolent being—commonly the Devil (in later times), Death, a demon or a genie—selling his soul for some power, then tricks the devil out of his prize. In one version, the smith gains the power to weld any material, he then uses this power to stick the devil to an immovable object, allowing the smith to renege on the bargain. It is indexed as ATU330.

The tale was collected by Giambattista Basile in Lo cunto de li cunti of 1634, then the Brothers Grimm in their Children's and Household Tales (published in two volumes in 1812 and 1815), although they removed it in editions of 1822 and later, substituting "Brother Lustig" and relegating references to it to the notes for "Gambling Hansel", a very similar tale. Edith Hodgetts' 1891 book Tales and Legends from the Land of the Tsar collects a Russian version, while Ruth Manning-Sanders included a Gascon version as "The Blacksmith and the Devil" in her 1970 book A Book of Devils and Demons..  Richard Chase presents a version from the Southern Appalachians, called "Wicked John and the Devil."

According to George Monbiot, the blacksmith is a motif of folklore throughout (and beyond) Europe associated with malevolence (the medieval vision of Hell may draw upon the image the smith at his forge), and several variant tales tell of smiths entering into a pact with the devil to obtain fire and the means of smelting metal.

According to research applying phylogenetic techniques to linguistics by folklorist Sara Graça da Silva and anthropologist Jamie Tehrani, "The Smith and the Devil" may be one of the oldest European folk tales, with the basic plot stable throughout the Indo-European speaking world from India to Scandinavia, possibly being first told in Indo-European 6,000 years ago in the Bronze Age. Folklorist John Lindow, however, notes that a word for "smith" may not have existed in Indo-European, and if so the tale may not be that old. However, according to historical linguist Václav Blažek: "The apparent fact, that there is no common designation of "smith" in the Indo-European lexicon, could be disappointing at first sight, but the same may be said about other crafts, including those using more ‘archaic’ technologies than smithery."  According to Blažek, the inherited designations for smith attested in the mythological context are "a witness of a remarkably important role of the institution of smithery in the period of disintegration of the Indo-European dialect continuum".

See also

Faust, a German legend also involving a pact with the devil
Wayland the Smith, a European myth also involving a smith
Errementari, a 2017 film based on a Basque version of the tale.

References

Bibliography

External links 

  

European fairy tales
Grimms' Fairy Tales
Fictional smiths
The Devil in fairy tales
Deal with the Devil
Fiction about personifications of death
ATU 300-399